Andriy Volodymyrovych Berezovchuk (born 16 April 1981) is a retired professional Ukrainian football defender who last played for Metalist Kharkiv in the Ukrainian Premier League.

References

External links
Profile
 

1981 births
Living people
Ukrainian footballers
FC Metalurh Donetsk players
FC Kharkiv players
FC Metalist Kharkiv players
MFC Mykolaiv players
Ukrainian Premier League players
Sportspeople from Mykolaiv
Association football defenders